Isotopes are any of the several different forms of an element each having different atomic mass (mass number).

Isotope can also refer to:
Isotope (band), a British jazz-rock band (1972–1976)
Isotope (album), a 1983 album by jazz pianist Kirk Lightsey
Isotope (catamaran), an American sailboat design
Albuquerque Isotopes, a minor league baseball team of the Pacific Coast League
Springfield Isotopes, a fictional baseball team in the TV show The Simpsons
Isotopes Punk Rock Baseball Club, a Canadian baseball-themed punk rock band
Isotope 217, a jazz band from Chicago, United States
Isotope 244, a video game developer based in the USA
Isotope (Jordan algebra) in mathematics, a method of modifying the product on a Jordan algebra
An isotope of an algebra: see Isotopy of algebras
An isotope of a loop or quasigroup: see Isotopy of loops

See also
Isotone
Isotropy, an unrelated concept
Isotype (disambiguation)
iZotope, Inc., an audio technology company